{{Speciesbox
| image = Naturalis Biodiversity Center - RMNH.MOL.265036 - Samoana inflata (Reeve, 1842) - Partulidae - Mollusc shell.jpeg
| status = EX 
| status_system = IUCN3.1
| status_ref =
| extinct = 1990s or 2000s
| genus = Samoana
| species = inflata
| authority = (Reeve, 1842)
| synonyms =
 Bulimus thersites L.Pfeiffer, 1842
 Partula inflata  Reeve, 1842
| synonyms_ref =
| display_parents = 9
}}

†Samoana inflata'' was a species of air-breathing land snail, a terrestrial pulmonate gastropod mollusk in the family Partulidae.

This species was endemic to Hiva Oa and Tahuata, in the Marquesas Islands. It went extinct in the 1990s or 2000s.

References

 Jacksonville Shell Club info

I
Extinct gastropods
Extinct animals of Oceania
Fauna of French Polynesia
Molluscs of Oceania